Catocala disjuncta is a moth of the family Erebidae. It is found from south-eastern Europe to Asia Minor.

The wingspan is about 40 mm. Adults are on wing from June to September.

References

External links
lepiforum.de: Catocala disjuncta

disjuncta
Moths described in 1828
Moths of Europe
Moths of the Middle East